Gabriel Jouveau-Dubreuil (1885–1945) was a French archaeologist who specialized in Southern India.

Jouveau-Dubreuil was the first discoverer of artifacts at Nagarjunakonda in Andhra Pradesh in 1926, before systematic digging was taken over by A. H. Longhurst in 1927. He published both in French and English.

Works
 Archaeologie du Sud de l'Inde Vol. 1 Vol.2
 Ancient History of the Deccan 
 The Pallavas 
 Pallava Antiquities

References

French archaeologists
1885 births
1945 deaths
20th-century archaeologists